Xu Yihai (born 2 March 1990) is a Chinese footballer.

Club career
Xu Yihai would play for the Shenzhen Ruby youth team before he was loaned to their satellite team Xiangxue Eisiti, which would play as a foreign team in the 2008–09 Hong Kong First Division League. He would make his professional debut in a league game on 9 September 2008 against Mutual FC that ended in a 0–0 draw. On his return he would be promoted to the senior Shenzhen team and go on to make his debut on 11 April 2009 in a league game against Dalian Shide F.C. in a 2–0 defeat. After two seasons he was allowed to leave the club to join second-tier football club Dalian Yifang where he did not make any senior appearances.

Xu joined third tier football club Qinghai Senke where the Head coach Song Lihui, moved him into a forward position, this move would revive his career when he was and become the clubs top goalscorer. His time at the club would come to end when the team disbanded due to financial difficulties at the end of the 2013 China League Two campaign.

Career statistics
Statistics accurate as of match played 31 December 2020.

References

External links

1990 births
Living people
Chinese footballers
Chinese expatriate footballers
Association football defenders
Chinese Super League players
China League One players
China League Two players
Shenzhen F.C. players
Dalian Professional F.C. players
Chengdu Better City F.C. players
Guangdong South China Tiger F.C. players
Qingdao Hainiu F.C. (1990) players
Chinese expatriate sportspeople in Hong Kong
Expatriate footballers in Hong Kong